A gametid is a complementary gamete to the gamete that gives rise to a zygote after conception. During meiosis, four gametes, or haploid cells, are the products of diploid cell division. Two gametes, one egg and one sperm, unite during conception, yielding a zygote. For each gamete that makes a zygote, there is a complementary gamete, or gametid. There are gametids for both egg and sperm gametes. Another word for a gametid is a nontransmitted gamete. These gametids come from the same primary gametocyte that yields the gamete that fuses to form the zygote. Gametids do not always develop into mature gametes. A common example of a gametid that does not develop into a mature gamete is a polar body. Gametogenesis is the process by which mature gametes are produced. In sequential order, gametes develop from primary gametocytes, to secondary gametocytes, to gametids, and then finally to gametes.

References

Germ cells